Roseofavolus is a monotypic fungal genus in the family Polyporaceae. Circumscribed by Japanese mycologist Tsutomu Hattori in 2003, it contains the single poroid species Roseofavolus eos. This fungus was first described by English mycologist E.J.H. Corner as Grifola eos in 1989. It is found in the Malay Peninsula, Java, and Borneo.

References

Polyporaceae
Monotypic Polyporales genera
Taxa described in 2003
Fungi of Asia